Blind But Now I See: The Biography of Music Legend Doc Watson is a book written by Kent Gustavson. The book serves as a comprehensive biography of the late guitarist and singer-songwriter Doc Watson (1923–2012).

Description
The book uses a variety of sources to tell the story of Watson's life and musical career, including historical archives, interviews, and news/media material. There is a particularly strong emphasis on interviews with people familiar with Watson; the book features interviews with around 100 of Watson's friends and collaborators.

Additionally, the book features a collection of quotations by various well-known people regarding Doc Watson, including former presidents Jimmy Carter and Bill Clinton and musicians Bob Dylan, Ben Harper, Chet Atkins, Béla Fleck, Warren Haynes, Ketch Secor of Old Crow Medicine Show, and Ricky Skaggs, among others.

Reception and awards

The book has been well received by critics and fans of Watson's music, with many critics praising the extensive research and detail put into the book. Greg Yost of Country Standard Time stated that "Gustavson uses his academic background to present an extensively researched and fairly even accounting of the artist's life." Dustin Ogdin of No Depression additionally praises the extensive research into both the positive and negative aspects of Watson's life and career.

The book won the 2011 Next Generation Indie Book Award for best biography and was a 2010  finalist in the ForeWord Magazine book of the year awards.

Release history
The first edition of the book was released in April 2010 by Blooming Twig Books and a second edition was released in March 2012 by Sumach-Red Books.

Gustavson is currently working on an expanded third edition of the book, addressing Watson's death and featuring new interviews and photographs.

List of interviews

The following is a selected list of people interviewed for the book:

References

External links
 Official book website
 Official author website

2010 non-fiction books
American biographies
Biographies about musicians